The 2003 Supercoppa Italiana was a match contested by Juventus, the 2002–03 Serie A champions, and Milan, the 2002–03 Coppa Italia winner. It was the sixth appearance for Juventus (3 victories in 1995, 1997 and 2002) and the seventh for Milan (victories in 1988, 1992, 1993, 1994).
The match was played in East Rutherford, New Jersey in the United States, the home pitch of the Major League Soccer club New York/New Jersey MetroStars (now New York Red Bulls), with a heavily Italian heritage in the region.  Both teams were touring the USA at the time as part of the ChampionsWorld Series, which this game also formed part of.

Juventus beat Milan on penalties, three months after losing to the same opposition in a shootout in the 2003 UEFA Champions League Final.

Match details

References

2003
Supercoppa 2003
Supercoppa 2003
Supercoppa Italiana 2003
Supercoppa Italiana
Sports competitions in East Rutherford, New Jersey